Twentieth-Century Science-Fiction Writers is a book by Curtis C. Smith published in October 1981 on science fiction authors in the 20th century. It is the third in the St. Martin's Press's Twentieth-Century Writers of the English Language series with the others being Twentieth-Century Crime and Mystery Writers and Twentieth-Century Children's Writers.

Background 
Curtis C. Smith (Associate Professor of Humanities at University of Houston–Clear Lake in Clear Lake City) worked on the book for more than three years assisted by 20 advisers and 146 contributors. All living authors were sent a questionnaire for biographical information and that information was cross-checked.

Content 
In the first edition, there are 540 entries for Anglo-American writers, 35 additional foreign language writers, and five "major fantasy writers." Anglo-American writer entries contain a biographical sketch besides including the address of the author or sometimes their literary agent. The bibliographies lists SF books, other publications, and published bibliographies of the author.

Reception 
Twentieth-Century Science-Fiction Writers was mainly received positively by critics but was critiqued for its bibliographical errors. Likewise, many gawked at its original $65 price. Science Fiction & Fantasy Book Reviews Neil Barron reviewed Twentieth-Century Science-Fiction Writers with "the bibliography which follows is relatively thorough." Foundations John Clute critiqued it with "I for one feel a sense of complex emotional and intellectual betrayal on contemplating the book." Locuss Jeff Frane critiqued the errors as missing, miscategorized, or mistitled entries but reviewed it favorably with "In spite of its flaws, it's a useful volume, one worth gaining access to somehow." Isaac Asimov's Science Fiction Magazines Baird Searles commented "In all, I judge it to be a source of much information even for the non-academic general reader" but disclaimed that he contributed three articles and was listed as an adviser.

References

External links 

1981 non-fiction books
Books about writers
Science fiction books